Rushda is a Muslim name for a female.  It means knowledge, true path, and guidance.

History

References

Given names
Arabic feminine given names
Arabic language